This is a list of Republic of the Congo writers.

 André-Patient Bokiba, academic
 Adèle Caby-Livannah (1957– )
 Emmanuel Dongala (1941– )
 Mambou Aimée Gnali (1935– )
Bill Kouélany (1965– ) 
 Sony Lab'ou Tansi (1947–1995), born in Congo-Kinshasa
 Henri Lopes (1937– ), born in Congo-Kinshasa
 Alain Mabanckou (1966– )
 Jadelin Mabiala Gangbo (1976– )
 Jean-Pierre Makouta-Mboukou (1929–2012)
 Martial Malinda, also known as Sylvain Bemba / Michel Belabin (1934–1995)
 Jean Malonga (1907–1985)
 Lassy Mbouity (1988– )
 Guy Menga (1935– )
 Florence Lina Mouissou (1972– ), novelist
 Maxime n'Debeka (1944– )
 Victor N'Gembo-Mouanda (1969– )
 Theophile Obenga (1936– )
 Martial Sinda  (c.1930– )
 Tchicaya U Tam'si (1931–1988)
 Jean-Baptiste Tati-Loutard (1938–2009)
 Jeannette Balou Tchichelle (1947–2005)
 Marie-Leontine Tsibinda
 Brigitte Yengo

See also 
 List of African writers by country

References 

Congo, Republic of the
Writers
Congo, Republic of the